Berlin Rathaus Steglitz (in German Bahnhof Berlin Rathaus Steglitz, meaning Steglitz Town Hall Station) is the name of both a railway station on the Wannsee Railway and a U-Bahn station in the district of Steglitz in Berlin, Germany, which are close together. It is served by the Berlin S-Bahn, Berlin U-Bahn and numerous local bus lines.

The subway station was built in 1974 by R. G. Rümmler. A platform for the planned U10 subway line was built also; however, it is unlikely that it will be constructed (planned to Lankwitz).

Gallery

S-Bahn

U-Bahn

References

External links

Station information 

Berlin S-Bahn stations
U9 (Berlin U-Bahn) stations
Railway stations in Berlin
Buildings and structures in Steglitz-Zehlendorf
Railway stations in Germany opened in 1839
Railway stations in Germany opened in 1974